Myers Arden Clark (May 7, 1904 – November 15, 1968) was an American football player in the National Football League for the Brooklyn Dodgers, the Cleveland Indians, the Boston Braves, the Cincinnati Reds, the St. Louis Gunners, and the Philadelphia Eagles.  He played college football at Ohio State University.

Clark also coached the Cincinnati Reds during their truncated 1933 season. He died at Dayton at the age of 64 in 1968.

References

1904 births
1968 deaths
American football fullbacks
American football halfbacks
American football quarterbacks
American football tackles
Boston Braves (NFL) players
Brooklyn Dodgers (NFL) players
Cincinnati Reds (NFL) coaches
Cincinnati Reds (NFL) players
Cleveland Indians (NFL 1931) players
Ohio State Buckeyes football players
Philadelphia Eagles players
St. Louis Gunners players
Sportspeople from Columbus, Ohio
People from Franklin, Ohio
Players of American football from Columbus, Ohio